The Valley View Ferry provides passage over the Kentucky River in rural central Kentucky. Located on Kentucky Route 169, this ferry service connects auto traffic between the county seats of Richmond in Madison County and Nicholasville in Jessamine County. The ferry was founded in 1780, predating Kentucky's admission to the Union in 1792. It is widely regarded as the commonwealth's oldest continually operating business.

John Craig, a Virginia veteran of the Revolutionary War, acquired land in the area in 1780 through a military warrant. In 1785, the Virginia General Assembly granted Craig "a perpetual and irrevocable" franchise to operate a ferry. Daniel Boone, Henry Clay, James Mason and Ulysses S. Grant were among its passengers.  The ferry remained a privately owned business for more than 200 years, passing through the hands of seven successive families until 1991. It was then purchased jointly by the Lexington-Fayette Urban County Government and Madison and Jessamine counties for $60,000.

The rudderless ferry is guided by cables stretching between four 55-foot towers. The current boat, named the "John Craig" after the franchise's original owner, dates to 1996. The vessel it replaced sustained heavy damage after sinking under the weight of a heavy snowfall and then as a result of salvage efforts.  The entire ferry site was renovated in 1998, when authorities replaced the four towers and their cables. Two years later, the ferry authority received a federal grant allowing an upgrade of the barge. The new vessel, longer than its predecessor by ten feet, enables the ferry to carry three cars instead of two.

The Kentucky Transportation Cabinet funds the ferry as a free service. On average it transports 250 cars a day.

Popular culture
The ferry appeared in background scenes of the 1967 Irvin Kershner film The Flim-Flam Man.

References

External links
Valley View Ferry: Lexington-Fayette Urban County Government

American companies established in 1785
Pre-statehood history of Kentucky
Ferries of Kentucky
Transportation in Jessamine County, Kentucky
Transportation in Madison County, Kentucky
Transportation in Lexington, Kentucky
1780 establishments in Virginia
Cable ferries in the United States
Nicholasville, Kentucky
Richmond, Kentucky